Mariia Oleksandrivna Yefrosinina (born  25 May 1979), professionally known as Masha Efrosinina, is a Ukrainian television host and media personality. Along with Pavlo Shylko, she hosted the 50th edition of the Eurovision Song Contest. 

In 2018, Masha became the United Nations Population Fund Goodwill Ambassador.

Biography
Graduating from high school with a gold medal (an honour roll), Efrosinina enrolled in the Department of Foreign Languages in the Kyiv University, graduating as an interpreter of the English and Spanish languages.

At 19 she debuted on the First National channel in the program Happy Bell. In 2002 she received the Teletriumph prize in the nomination the Best TV show.

She co-presented the 50th Eurovision Song Contest alongside Pavlo Shylko, in 2005 from Kyiv's Sports Palace, to a pan-European TV-audience of an estimated 150 million people.
She has also co-presented the UEFA Euro 2012 draw held at the Palace of Culture and Science in Warsaw, on 7 February 2010.

She presented Fabryka Zirok, the Ukrainian version of Star Academy, with co-host Andriy Domanskyi, on Novyi Kanal.

On 18 November 2010 Efrosinina placed the 77th place among the most influential females in Ukraine according to the Ukrainian magazine Focus.

Personal life
Masha got married in 2003 to Tymur Khromaiev, an Ossetian-Ukrainian, son of the president of Ukrainian basketball league Zurab Khromaiev. 
Husband
Tymur Khromaiev is a graduate of the Finance Department of Union College (New York) with bachelors in economics. Tymur Khromaiev is a representative of a financial consulting company that cooperated with Naftogaz Ukrainy in its restructuring. Since 2002 he is director of his own investment company "ARTA" that works in a field of corporate financing, investment banking, brokerage, and assets management.

Yelyzaveta Yushchenko
Her sister Yelyzaveta, who is two years younger, married Andriy Yushchenko, son of the former Ukrainian president Viktor Yushchenko. She also graduated Kyiv University (2009) department of psychology and now works as specialist in a child psychology. On 10 March 2010 the young Yushchenko family increased in size by a girl, Varvara.

Awards
 Order of Merit, Third Class (2020)

See also
 List of Eurovision Song Contest presenters

References

External links

  Brief biography and pictures
  Офшор допоможе "Нафтогазу" реструктурувати борги (Association of Gas Traders of Ukraine, AGTU)
  Про консультантів, євробонди та наперсточників (Дзеркало Тижня № 33 (761) 5 — 11 вересня 2009)

1979 births
Living people
Taras Shevchenko National University of Kyiv alumni
Ukrainian translators
Translators from English
Translators from Spanish
Ukrainian television presenters
Ukrainian women television presenters
People from Kerch
People from the Crimean Oblast
Ukrainian people of Russian descent
Recipients of the Order of Merit (Ukraine), 3rd class